This is a list of fortifications past and present, a fortification being a major physical defensive structure often composed of a more or less wall-connected series of forts.

Individual fortifications

listed by name
A Famosa, built in the 16th century in Malacca by the Portuguese following their defeat of the Malaccan Sultante. 
Alderney
Alpine Wall
Anastasian Wall, built in the 5th century across the Thracian peninsula for the protection of Constantinople
Antonine Wall, built by the Romans in northern Britain
Atlantic Wall, constructed by the Germans during the Second World War
Babylon Fortress in Old Cairo.
Baggush Box
Bar Lev Line
Beijing city fortifications
British anti-invasion preparations of the Second World War
British hardened field defences of World War II
Castle of Bouka, Preveza, Greece
Brimstone Hill Fortress, Saint Thomas Middle Island, Saint Kitts and Nevis
Cairo Citadel, Egypt
Castle Islands Fortifications, Bermuda
Corradino Lines, Paola, Malta
Cottonera Lines, Cottonera, Malta
Czechoslovak border fortifications
Danevirke
Devils Battery, Halifax Harbour, Nova Scotia
Defense line of Amsterdam
The Dutch Water Line, protecting the core provinces of the Netherlands, utilising the flooding of areas with water
Elvas Fortifications, the largest bulwarked dry ditch system in the world, protecting the Portuguese garrison border town of Elvas.
Festungsfront Oder-Warthe-Bogen
Floriana Lines, Floriana, Malta
Fort Jesus, built in the 15th century in Mombassa by the Portuguese.
Götavirke (Sweden)
Great Wall of China, built as a protection from the northern steppe nomads
Great Abatis Border
Gustav Line, a fortified German defensive line in Italy during the Second World War 
Hadrian's Wall, built by the Romans in northern Britain
Hexamilion wall, built across the Isthmus of Corinth
Hilsea Lines, built to protect Portsmouth
Hindenburg line
Humaitá
Hindenburg Wall
Intramuros, Manila
Justinian Walls (in several locations along the borders of the Byzantine empire)
Klis Fortress in Croatia
Krepost Sveaborg, Imperial Russian First World War fortifications around Helsinki
Limes Germanicus, Roman defensive line along the Rhine and in South-western Germany
Limes Moesiae - defensive frontier system in Southeast Europe, a collection of Roman fortifications between the Black Sea shore and Pannonia, present-day Hungary, consisting primarily of forts along the Danube (so-called Danubian Limes) to protect the Roman provinces of Upper and Lower Moesia south of the river
Lines of Torres Vedras, built to protect the Lisbon Region, during the Peninsular War
London Wall, the Roman wall around the city
Maginot Line, built by France in the 1930s
Mannerheim Line, built by Finland across the Karelian Isthmus
Metaxas Line, built during 1936-1940 by Greece along its frontier with Bulgaria
Molotov Line
Montségur
National Redoubt (Belgium)
Newcastle town wall
Offa's Dyke, an 8th-century earthwork dividing England and Wales
Grim's Ditch
Per Albin Line (Sweden)
Petrovaradin fortress, in Northern Serbia, Austrian fortress from the 18th century. 
Rupel Fortress, in Northern Greece, later incorporated in the Metaxas Line
Rupnik Line
Santa Margherita Lines, in Cospicua, Malta
Saxon Shore, in southern Britain and northern France
Siegfried Line, constructed along Nazi Germany's western borders in the 1930s
Stalin Line, built along the Soviet Union's western borders in the 1930s
Suomenlinna, an 18th-century fortress in Helsinki
Victoria Lines, in northern Malta
York city walls

Articles relating to cities

Europe
Ceintures de Lyon, built in the 19th century to surround the city of Lyon, France
Walled city of Jajce, Bosnia
Walled city of Počitelj, Bosnia
Walled city of Vratnik, Bosnia
Walls of Constantinople (modern day Istanbul), surrounding the city since the 4th century
Walls of Dubrovnik, Croatia
Roman walls of Lugo, Galicia, surrounding the city since the 1st century
Walls of Ávila,Spain.
Walls of Nicosia, Cyprus
Walls of Ston, Croatia
Fortifications of Antwerp, Belgium
Fortifications of Birgu, Malta
Fortifications of Chania, Crete, Greece
Fortifications of Famagusta, Cyprus
Fortifications of Heraklion, Crete, Greece
Fortifications of London, England
Fortifications of Kotor, Montenegro
Fortifications of Mdina, Malta
Fortifications of Messina, Sicily, Italy
Fortifications of Metz, France
Fortifications of Portsmouth, England
Fortifications of Senglea, Malta
Fortifications of Valletta, Malta
Defence lines of the Netherlands
Lines of Communication (London), English Civil War fortifications built around London between 1642 and 1643.
List of town walls in England and Wales
Rocca di Manerba del Garda (Lombardy), Italy.

Africa 

 Egypt

See also
 List of buildings
 List of castles
 List of forts
 List of walls
 List of cities with defensive walls
 List of established military terms (Engineering)
 Martello tower

Fortifications
List